Java is a dance which was developed in France in the early part of the 20th century. The origin of its name is uncertain, but it probably evolved from the valse.

Mainly performed in French bal-musette between 1910 and 1960, the dance was largely conceived due to popular demand for a new type of waltz. In particular, one which was easier, faster, more sensual, and would not require a dance hall as large as those typically used for waltzes.

Java takes the form of a fast waltz, with the dancers dancing very close to one another, taking small steps to advance. Men will often place both their hands on their partner's buttocks while dancing. Naturally, this led some of the more respectable bal-musette dance halls banning java.

Titles 
 Georgius - La plus bath des javas, 1925
 Alibert and Gaby Sims - Un petit cabanon, 1935
 Edith Piaf - La java de cézigue, 1936
 Georgette Plana - La Java bleue, 1938
 Darcelys - Une partie de pétanque, 1941
 Edith Piaf - L'Accordéoniste, 1942
 Boris Vian - La Java des bombes atomiques, 1955
 Léo Ferré - Java partout, 1957
 Claude Nougaro - Le Jazz et la Java, 1962
 Serge Gainsbourg - La Javanaise, 1963
 Michel Sardou - La Java de Broadway, 1977
 TC Matic - Le Java, 1982

On film
A java is danced during a key scene at a working class café in Jean Vigo's film L'Atalante (1934). Composer Maurice Jaubert arranged his java melody for player piano; it recurs later in the soundtrack as a refrain for accordion.

Bibliography 
 Henri Joannis Deberne, Danser en société, Christine Bonneton editor, 3/1999, Paris  p. 144-145

French dances
French music